John Wellington Ennis (born February 21, 1973 in Los Angeles, California) is an American filmmaker, activist, and blogger. In 2004, he directed a film starring Amy Poehler and the Upright Citizens Brigade titled Wild Girls Gone. He is the co-founder of Video the Vote, a non-partisan group interested in documenting problems at U.S. polls.  Ennis and Video the Vote co-created Free for All, a 2008 documentary about fraud in U.S. elections. He is also the founder of Shoot First, Inc., a film production company.  His latest film is Pay 2 Play: Democracy's High Stakes, a feature-length documentary about the corrupting influence of money in our political system, featuring Robert Reich, Lawrence Lessig, John Nichols, Marianne Williamson and more...

Ennis has produced and developed reality television for FremantleMedia, RDF Media, and Nash Entertainment, and his work has been seen on NBC, Fox, CBS, ABC, TLC, BBC, and The Oprah Winfrey Show. Ennis’s New York City Toolz of the New School was a cult hit in the late 1990s. Ennis has produced many musical documentary, with many of today’s artists, such as Weezer, Linkin Park, Fall Out Boy, Fergie, John Mayer, Jane’s Addiction, Ne-Yo, Sarah McLachlan, Jack Johnson, Red Hot Chili Peppers, Audioslave and others.

Filmography

References

External links
 
 Shoot First, Inc.

Living people
1973 births
American male bloggers
American bloggers
21st-century American non-fiction writers